A by-election was held in the Alberta federal riding of Beaver River on March 13, 1989. The election was triggered by the death of incumbent John Dahmer, who died five days after winning the seat in the 1988 federal election.

Reform candidate Deborah Grey won the by-election, becoming the party's first elected MP.

Results

See also 

 By-elections to the 34th Canadian Parliament

References 

Beaver River
Beaver_River_federal_by-election
Federal by-elections in Alberta
May 1989 events in Canada